The 1991 Plaid Cymru presidential election was held following the resignation of Dafydd Elis Thomas, who had led the party since 1984 after his announcement that he would stand down as an MP at the 1992 general election.

On 18 September 1991 it was reported that Dafydd Wigley was to stand for the post of President of Plaid Cymru, nominations closed a week later on 24 September with Dayfydd Wigley being the only candidate.

Wigley formally took over as leader at Plaid Cymru's conference which was held over the weekend of 26/27 October 1991.

Wigley would go onto lead Plaid until his resignation in 2000 by which point the party had increased its number of MPs from three to four, gained their first two MEPs and won 17 out of the 60 available seats in the inaugural election to The National Assembly for Wales.

Notes

References

Plaid Cymru leadership elections
Plaid Cymru presidential election
Plaid Cymru presidential election
1990s elections in Wales
Plaid Cymru presidential election
Plaid Cymru presidential election